Timothy Crane Day (January 8, 1819 – April 15, 1869) was a U.S. Representative from Ohio.

Born in Cincinnati, Ohio, Day attended the public schools. Day worked as a printer and engraver from 1838 to 1840. When his older brother died in 1850, he took his job as one of the editors and proprietors of the Cincinnati Enquirer.
Disposed of his interests in that paper in 1852 and made a tour of Europe.

Day was elected as an Opposition Party candidate to the Thirty-fourth Congress (March 4, 1855 – March 3, 1857).
Day Ran as an Anti-Nebraska, or anti-slavery, candidate. He declined renomination in 1856 because of ill health and retired from active business.
Day endowed the Ohio Mechanics Institute toward establishing a permanent library. When this library closed, the bequeath was transferred to the University of Cincinnati's College of Applied Science in 1911 and bears his name as the Timothy C. Day Technical Library. He died in Cincinnati, Ohio, April 15, 1869.
He was interred in Spring Grove Cemetery.

References

1819 births
1869 deaths
Politicians from Cincinnati
Opposition Party members of the United States House of Representatives from Ohio
19th-century American newspaper publishers (people)
19th-century American journalists
American male journalists
Burials at Spring Grove Cemetery
19th-century American male writers
19th-century American politicians
The Cincinnati Enquirer people